The 2016 United States Senate election in Kentucky was held November 8, 2016 to elect a member of the United States Senate to represent the State of Kentucky, concurrently with the 2016 U.S. presidential election, as well as other elections to the United States Senate in other states and elections to the United States House of Representatives and various state and local elections. The primaries were held May 17.

Incumbent Republican Senator Rand Paul filed for re-election in December 2015, and Mayor Jim Gray of Lexington filed to run against Paul for the Senate in late January 2016. In the general election, Paul defeated Gray by 14.5 points.

Background 
If Paul had become the Republican presidential (or vice-presidential) nominee, state law would have prohibited him from simultaneously running for re-election. In March 2014, the Republican-controlled Kentucky Senate passed a bill that would allow Paul to run for both offices, but the Democratic-controlled Kentucky House of Representatives declined to take it up. Paul spent his own campaign money in the 2014 legislative elections, helping Republican candidates for the State House in the hopes of flipping the chamber, thus allowing the legislature to pass the bill (Democratic Governor Steve Beshear's veto could have been overridden with a simple majority). However, the Democrats retained their 54-46 majority in the State House.

Paul was running for both president and re-election, and considered several options to get around the law preventing him from appearing twice on the ballot, but he dropped his presidential bid to focus on re-election to the Senate on February 3, 2016. His supporters said the law does not apply to federal offices and suggested changing the May Kentucky presidential primaries to March caucuses would allow Paul to run for re-election and continue to seek the presidential nomination. However, this option would have only worked until the presidential primaries were over, as he would still have had to appear on the ballot twice in November if he had won the Republican presidential nomination. Other options that were open to him included running for both offices and leaving it to Democratic Secretary of State Alison Lundergan Grimes to remove him from the ballot; attempting to replace Grimes in the 2015 elections with a Republican Secretary of State who would not enforce the law; filing a lawsuit against the law; and running for president in every state except for Kentucky, where he could have run for re-election and hoped to win the presidency without Kentucky's electoral college votes.

In a letter to Kentucky Republicans in February 2015, Paul asked them to allow him the same option afforded to Wisconsin Congressman Paul Ryan, who ran for re-election at the same time as Vice President on Mitt Romney's ticket. David M. Drucker of The Washington Examiner reported in the same month that Kentucky Republican leaders were concerned that Paul's actions could mean that if he wins the Republican presidential nomination and is renominated for the Senate, he could either be disqualified from the Senate ballot and the state party blocked from replacing him, which would hand the seat to the Democrats, or he could be disqualified from the presidential ballot, which would see the Democratic presidential nominee pick up Kentucky's 8 electoral college votes.

In August 2015, the central committee of the Kentucky Republican Party voted to hold a caucus in 2016, allowing Paul to simultaneously run for re-nomination for his seat and the 2016 Republican presidential nomination. State law would still bar Paul from appearing twice on the ballot in the general election. However, on February 3, 2016, Rand Paul dropped out of the 2016 presidential campaign, allowing him to focus on his reelection bid.

Republican primary

Candidates

Declared 
 James Gould, financial analyst and Navy veteran
 Rand Paul, incumbent U.S. Senator
 Stephen Slaughter, engineer

Declined 
 Andy Barr, U.S. Representative
 James Comer, former Kentucky Agriculture Commissioner and candidate for Governor of Kentucky in 2015 (running for KY-01)
 Brett Guthrie, U.S. Representative
 Hal Heiner, Kentucky Secretary of Education and Workforce Development, former Louisville Metro Council member and candidate for Governor of Kentucky in 2015
 Thomas Massie, U.S. Representative
 Hal Rogers, U.S. Representative
 Ed Whitfield, U.S. Representative
 Catherine Todd Bailey, businesswoman and former United States Ambassador to Latvia
 Mike Duncan, former Chairman of the Republican National Committee
 Trey Grayson, former Director of the Institute of Politics at Harvard Kennedy School, former Secretary of State of Kentucky and candidate for the U.S. Senate in 2010

Endorsements

Results

Democratic primary

Candidates

Declared 
 Jim Gray, Mayor of Lexington
 Rory Houlihan
 Jeff Kender, steelworker
 Ron Leach, physician assistant, U.S. Army veteran, and nominee for KY-02 in 2014
 Tom Recktenwald, retired technology teacher and candidate for the U.S. Senate in 2014
 Grant Short, pilot and businessman
 Sellus Wilder, former Frankfort City Commissioner

Declined 
 Rocky Adkins, Majority Leader of the Kentucky House of Representatives (running for reelection)
 Adam Edelen, former State Auditor of Kentucky
 Greg Fischer, Mayor of Louisville and candidate for the U.S. Senate in 2008
 Andrew Horne, attorney, retired United States Marine Corps Lieutenant Colonel and candidate for KY-03 in 2006
 Greg Stumbo, Speaker of the Kentucky House of Representatives and former Attorney General of Kentucky (running for reelection)
 Steve Beshear, former Governor of Kentucky and nominee for U.S. Senate in 1996
 Ben Chandler, former U.S. Representative
 Jack Conway, former Attorney General of Kentucky, nominee for the U.S. Senate in 2010 and nominee for Governor of Kentucky in 2015
 Alison Lundergan Grimes, Secretary of State of Kentucky and nominee for the U.S. Senate in 2014
 Heather French Henry, former Commissioner of the Kentucky Department of Veterans Affairs and former Miss America
 Ashley Judd, actress and political activist
 Crit Luallen, former Lieutenant Governor of Kentucky and former Kentucky Auditor of Public Accounts
 Jennifer Moore, former Chairwoman of the Kentucky Democratic Party
 David Tandy, President of the Louisville Metro Council

Endorsements

Results

General election

Debates

Predictions

Polling

with Thomas Massie

with Rand Paul

Results

References

External links 
Official campaign websites (Archived)
 Rand Paul (R) for Senate
 Jim Gray (D) for Senate

2016
Kentucky
United States Senate
Rand Paul